Jean-Philippe Ricci is a French actor.

Career 
After studying acting in Marseille, Jean-Philippe Ricci is directed by Philippe Harel and Jacques Audiard. He played the role of Vetturi in A Prophet in 2009 with Niels Arestrup and Tahar Rahim.

On television, he was the commissaire Damiani in Mafiosa (TV series) and Yvan Colonna in Pierre Schoeller's Les Anonymes about the assassination of Claude Érignac.

Filmography

Film 
 2001 : Chanson entre deux by Anna Novion, short
 2008 : Les Randonneurs à Saint-Tropez by Philippe Harel 
 2009 : Dogfight by Antoine Elizabé, short
 2009 : A Prophet by Jacques Audiard : Vettori
 2010 : Les Princes de la nuit by Patrick Levy : Tex
 2011 : Requista by Julien Izard : Riton Panucci, short
 2012 : Mauvaise posture by David Mabille : Simon, short
 2013 : Suis-je le gardien de mon frère? by Frédéric Farrucci : Joseph, short
 2013 : Suzanne Dadas by Clémentine Delbecq : Moune, short
 2013 : Migraines by Hélène Couturier : Joseph, short
 2014 : Rien à faire by Julien Izard
 2015 : Entre amis by Olivier Barroux
 2015 : Les Exilés by Rinatu Frassati, short
 2018 : Abdel et la Comtesse by Isabelle Doval : Vincent
 2018 : Béatrice by Rinatu Frassati, short
 2019 : Salauds de pauvres, collectif
 2019 : Aiò Zitelli ! by Jean-Marie Antonini, short : Julien
 2019 : Naufrages by Dominique Lienhard
 2019 : Inséparables by Varante Soudjian : Serge Ferroni
 2020 : Belle Fille by Méliane Marcaggi

Television 
 2009 : Le Débarcadère des anges by Brigitte Roüan : Père Corbucci
 2010-2014 : Mafiosa (TV series), seasons 3 to 5 :  Commissaire Alain Damiani
 2013 : Les Anonymes - Ùn' pienghjite micca by Pierre Schoeller : Yvan Colonna
 2013 : Crossing Lines : Philippe
 2014 : Disparus by Thierry Binisti
 2015 : Hard, season 3
 2016 : Bois d'ébène by Moussa Touré
 2017 : Tensions au Cap Corse by Stéphanie Murat
 2017 : Alex Hugo : Les Amants du levant by Olivier Langlois
 2017 : Quadras, by Mélissa Drigeard et Vincent Juillet : Julien 2019 : Le Temps est assassin by Claude-Michel Rome : Éric Rocca 2019 : Meurtres en Cotentin by Jérémy Minui : Étienne Letourneau 2020 : La Garçonne by Paolo Barzman : Alberti 2022 : Peaky Blinders : Fishing Boat Captain Web serie 
 2009 : Le Train corse Clip 
 2009 : Le Turc de Savants des Rimes

 Theatre 
 En attendant le train, dir by Karine Nuris - Théâtre Montmartre-Galabru
 Zig et More from Marine Auriol - Théâtre-Studio of Alfortville
 2000 : Blasted from Sarah Kane, dir by Christian Benedetti - Théâtre-Studio of Alfortville, Théâtre Nanterre-Amandiers : Le soldat 2015-2016 : Marie Tudor by Victor Hugo, dir by Philippe Calvario - Théâtre Pépinière Opéra, tour
 2017 : Ulysse sans terre, dir by Orlando Furioso - Théâtre de Bastia : Ulysse 2020 : Intra Muros'' dir by Alexis Michalik, Théâtre de la Pépinière

References

External links 
 

Living people
French male film actors
French male television actors
French male stage actors
21st-century French male actors
Year of birth missing (living people)